Tim Forsyth (born 17 August 1973 in Mirboo North, Victoria, Australia) is a retired Australian three-time Olympic high jumper: 1992, 1996, and 2000).

Forsyth's first success on the international scene came in 1990 with a silver medal at the World Junior Championships. In 1992 a 19-year-old Forsyth won an Olympic bronze medal, equalling his then personal best height of 2.34m. He went on to win another World Junior Championships silver medal, this time beaten by Brit Steve Smith. At the 1994 Commonwealth Games Forsyth finished ahead of Steve Smith.

His ultimate personal best jump of 2.36m was set in 1997, five months before he won his last global-event medal: A bronze at the World Championships in Athens. 2.36m was his ninth Australian record, and also the Oceanian area record. Forsyth is a six-time national champion for Australia in the men's high jump event.

He is the son of former Essendon footballer Jim Forsyth.

Competition record

References

External links

1973 births
Living people
Australian male high jumpers
Athletes (track and field) at the 1992 Summer Olympics
Athletes (track and field) at the 1996 Summer Olympics
Athletes (track and field) at the 2000 Summer Olympics
Athletes (track and field) at the 1994 Commonwealth Games
Athletes (track and field) at the 1998 Commonwealth Games
Olympic athletes of Australia
Commonwealth Games medallists in athletics
World Athletics Championships medalists
Medalists at the 1992 Summer Olympics
Olympic bronze medalists for Australia
Olympic bronze medalists in athletics (track and field)
Commonwealth Games gold medallists for Australia
Commonwealth Games bronze medallists for Australia
Medallists at the 1994 Commonwealth Games